Subhash Kapoor is an Indian American art dealer who was convicted for running a $100 million international smuggling racket. He was previously the owner of the Art of the Past gallery in Manhattan. His sister business, Nimbus Import/Exports, specialised in selling antiquities from across the Indian Subcontinent and Southeast Asia to major museums around the world.

Arrest 
On 30 October 2011, Kapoor was arrested at Frankfurt International Airport and on 14 July 2012 extradited to Chennai, India on charges of receiving artifacts that had been stolen from disused temples in southern India. Many of these objects were purchased by museums throughout the world. For example, in 2008 an 11th-century Chola-period bronze statue of a Dancing Shiva was sold by Kapoor to the National Gallery of Australia for $5.6 million (see Sripuranthan Natarajan Idol). The statue was allegedly stolen from an Indian temple in Tamil Nadu.

He was kept at the Vellore prison, but was later shifted to Tiruchirappalli Central Prison. He was attacked by a fellow inmate Kongu Yuvaraj, who was accused of committing an honor killing, following a heated argument between these two.

Recovery of smuggled items
In April 2022, the Yale University Art Gallery surrendered items valued at more than $1 million as part of art looting investigation. The 13 South Asian artifacts returned by the museum were smuggled by Kapoor.

See also 
Sripuranthan Natarajan Idol

References

External links
Archived copy of the Art of the Past gallery website

Living people
American art dealers
Art thieves
Year of birth missing (living people)
Art gallery owners
American people of Indian descent